Givat Yoav is an Israeli settlement organized as a moshav, located in the Golan Heights. The international community considers Israeli settlements in the Golan Heights illegal under international law, but the Israeli government disputes this.

History
The settlement was built in the 1960s and was named for Col. Yoav Shaham, who was killed during the Samu Incident in 1966. It falls under the municipal jurisdiction of the Golan Regional Council.

See also
Israeli-occupied territories

References

Israeli settlements in the Golan Heights
Golan Regional Council
Moshavim
Populated places in Northern District (Israel)
Populated places established in 1968
1968 establishments in the Israeli Military Governorate